is a railway station in Sakurai, Nara Prefecture, Japan.

Line
Kintetsu Railway
Osaka Line

Layout
The station has two island platforms serving two tracks each.

Adjacent stations

Railway stations in Japan opened in 1944
Railway stations in Nara Prefecture